Bishop James Moynagh S.P.S. (1903–1985), was an Irish-born Roman Catholic priest who served for the Saint Patrick’s Society for the Foreign Missions in Nigeria, and was ordained Bishop of Calabar.

Life
He was born on 25 April 1903 to Patrick Moynagh and Margaret Moynagh (née Smith), of Legwee, Loughduff, Ballinagh, Mullahoran, Co. Cavan, and educated at St. Mel's College, Longford.  He studied for the priesthood in Maynooth College, where he was ordained in 1930 for the Diocese of Ardagh and Clonmacnoise, but volunteered to serve in Nigeria.

Moynagh was ordained a bishop in 1947, in Maynooth, and appointed Vicar Apostolic Calabar Nigeria, becoming the first resident Bishop of Calabar in 1950.

Bishop Moynagh was instrumental in the foundation of the Medical Missionaries of Mary (his sister Sr. Mary Joseph Moynagh was an early member of the congregation, and served as its fourth superior) and that of the Handmaids of the Holy Child Jesus.

Moynagh resigned as bishop in 1970 due to the civil war in Nigeria (all foreign-born missionaries were excluded from Nigeria) and following his return from there, he was appointed Parish Priest of Annaduff, Co. Leitrim.

He spent his final years at Kiltegan, with the St. Patrick's Missionary Society, and died on 11 June 1985.

The Bishop James Moynagh Pastoral Centre in the Roman Catholic Diocese of Uyo in Nigeria, is named in his honour.

References

1903 births
1985 deaths
People from County Cavan
Alumni of St Patrick's College, Maynooth
Roman Catholic missionaries in Nigeria
20th-century Roman Catholic bishops in Nigeria
Irish expatriate Catholic bishops
Irish expatriates in Nigeria
Roman Catholic archbishops of Calabar
Roman Catholic bishops of Calabar
People educated at St Mel's College